Cambodia competed at the 2008 Summer Paralympics in Beijing.

Athletics

See also
Cambodia at the Paralympics
Cambodia at the 2008 Summer Olympics

External links
Beijing 2008 Paralympic Games Official Site
International Paralympic Committee

References

Nations at the 2008 Summer Paralympics
2008
Paralympics